Off Centaur Publications was the first "commercial" filk label.  It was founded in 1980 by Teri Lee, Jordin Kare, and Catherine Cook.  For a short time, Off Centaur produced high quality recordings of some of filk's best performers, and changed the course of filk music.

Like some other filk labels the name was a pun, in this case upon the idiom "off center" meaning eccentric, odd, or unusual -- all of which could be considered legitimate characterizations of filk music. (Other filk labels have included Wail Songs, Unlikely Publications, and Random Factors, illustrating the style of self-deprecating humor common among these publishers.)

Releases from this label are very difficult to find. At an Interfilk auction at FilKONtario, a copy of Horse-Tamer's Daughter was sold for CA$400.00. Admittedly, since these are charity auctions to support the filk community, prices at Interfilk auctions do tend to run higher than typical. However, Off Centaur tapes are commonly considered "unobtainium" since few have been republished or re-created, and the best do tend to command collector prices.

Off Centaur Publications was inducted into the Filk Hall of Fame in 1995.

Notable albums and performers 
 A Wolfrider's Reflections, Songs Of Elfquest by Cynthia McQuillin, Mercedes Lackey, Leslie Fish, Julia Ecklar (1984) 
 Cold Iron by Leslie Fish (lyrics by Rudyard Kipling) (1983)
 The Best of Chi-con IV - anthology, recorded live at the 1982 Worldcon
 Minus Ten and Counting: Songs of the Space Age
 Horse-Tamer's Daughter by Julia Ecklar
 Singer in the Shadow by Cynthia McQuillin 
 Captain Jack and the Mermaid by Meg Davis
 Lovers, Heroes & Rogues by Michael Longcor
 On a Bright Wind by Kathy Mar (1984)
 Murder, Mystery and Mayhem anthology, lyrics by Mercedes Lackey (1985)
 Past Due by Bill Sutton (1986)
 Rebel Yells—anthology, recorded live at the 1986 Worldcon
 Where No Man...—a collection of Star Trek filk songs  (1987)

Books 
 Westerfilk Collection

See also
 List of record labels

Notes

External links
 Library listing
 Filk FAQ OCP catalog numbers
American record labels
Record labels established in 1980
Filk music